Alif is an Indian Hindi film jointly produced by Pawan Tiwari and Zaigham Imam. Alif is written and directed by Zaigham Imam. The trailer of the film was launched by Uttar Pradesh Chief Minister Akhilesh Yadav and Jaya Bachchan on 27 December 2016.  It stars Neelima Azeem, Bhavna Pani, Pawan Tiwari, Danish Hussain, Aditya Om, Saud Mansuri, Shimala Prasad as the lead characters.

Alif deals with the importance of modern education. The narrator of the film is veteran actress Jaya Bachchan.

Cast 
 Neelima Azeem as Zeher Raza
 Danish Husain as Mohammad Raza
 Bhavna Pani 
 Pawan Tiwari 
 Aditya Om as Jamal
 Saud Mansuri as Ali Raza
 Shimala Prasad 
 Gauri Shanker 
 Ishaan

Festivals
Alif premièred in the Indian International Film Festival of Queensland, Australia in November 2016. It also won the Best Screenplay and Best Child Artist award at the Bioscope Global Film Festival.

References

External links
 
 

Indian drama films
2016 drama films
2016 films
2010s Hindi-language films
Hindi-language drama films